Radical Party may refer to any of a number of political parties professing the progressive-liberal ideology known as Radicalism:

Worldwide
Nonviolent Radical Party Transnational and Transparty (1989–present)

Europe
In the western Mediterranean European countries, Radicalism was one of the major political movements between 1848 and 1940. Such parties were often labelled 'Democratic', 'Radical democratic', or 'Radical liberal' parties:

 In France:
Radical Left (1902–1940), parliamentary group of the Independent Radicals.
Radical-Socialist Party (France) (1901–present)
Radical Party of the Left (1971–present)
Radical Movement (2017–2021), former merger of the Radical Party and the Radical Party of the Left.
 In Italy:
Italian Radical Party (1877–1925)
Radical Party (Italy) (1955–1989)
Italian Radicals (2001–present)
Radical Socialist Movement (2006-present), formed by dissidents members of the Radicals of the Left
Liberty and Equality (2010-present), formed by dissidents members of the Radicals of the Left
 In Spain, Radicalism took the form of various parties labelled 'democratic', 'progressive', 'radical' and 'republican':
 the Progressive Party (1835–69), formed by former participants in the radical Revolution of 1820;
 the Democratic Party (1849–69) a Spanish progressive party of Jacobin and 1848er inspiration, active in the 1850s.
 the Federal Democratic Republican Party (1868–1910)
 the Democratic Radical Party (1869–80), successor the Progressive Party. It was refounded in 1880, following splinters, as the Progressive Democratic Party (1880–1912)
 the successor Democratic Party (1876–9) reformed as the Possibilist Democratic Party (1879–90)
 The Radical-Republican Party (1908–40), a splinter of the Progressive Democratic Party;
 Its splinter, the Radical-Socialist Republican Party (1928–34). This merged with others to form the Republican Left (1934–59)
 A second splinter of the Radical-Republican Party formed the Republican Democratic Party and Republican Union (1934–59)

In the Dutch-speaking, German-speaking and Nordic countries, the English or French term Radical was represented by terms that literally translated as 'Free-Minded' (or, alternatively, as 'Freethinker' or 'Rationalist'), including:

 In Switzerland:
 the original Radical Party (1830s–1894), see Regeneration (Switzerland)
 the comparatively left-leaning successor party known as the Radical-Democratic Party (in French) and the Free-minded Democratic Party (German) (1878 to present)
 the comparatively right-leaning successor party known as the Radical-Liberal Party (1893 to 2009), and its successor the FDP, whose name translates to the Free-minded and Liberal Party in German and the Radical and Liberal Party in French (2009–present)
 In Luxembourg: 
 the Liberal League (1904–28), although predominantly classical liberal rather than Radical, contained a left-wing faction of Radical ideology;
 the Radical Socialist Party (1925–1932), founded by the splinter of the left-wing of the old Liberal League;
 the Radical Party (Luxembourg) (1928–1932), founded by the splinter of the right-wing of the Radical Socialist Party.
the Radical Liberal Party (Luxembourg) (1932–1945), formed as a merger of the Radical Socialist Party and Radical Party
 In the Netherlands:
 the Radical League (1892–1901)
 the Free-minded Democratic League (1901-1946)
the Political Party of Radicals (1968–1991)
 In Germany, a succession of Radical parties existed:
 The German Free-minded Party (1884 to 1893), which split into two successors:
 the left-leaning Free-minded Union (1893 to 1910)
 and the centre-leaning the Free-minded People's Party (1893 to 1910)
 These merged as the Progressive People's Party (1910 to 1918)
 This was reformed as the German Democratic Party (1918 to 1930).
 In Scandinavia:
 In Denmark, the current Liberal Party began as a Radical Party, hence its name in Danish (Venstre, 'Left'). The Radical wing split off from the classical-liberal majority in 1905 to form a new party, known as Radikale Venstre (Radical Left).
 In Sweden, the Free-minded National Association (1902 to 1934)
 In Norway, the Free-minded Liberal Party (1909 to 1932) and Free-minded People's Party (1932 to 1935)
 In Finland, the Young Finns (1905-1918), its successor the National Progressive Party (1919–51), and its successor the Free-minded League (1951 to 1965)

In south-eastern Europe, Radicalism was also a historically important political movement:

 In Bulgaria, the Radical Democratic Party (1902–present)
 In Greece
 the Party of Radicals (1848-1864) of the United States of the Ionian Islands
 the Venizelist splinter from the Liberal Party and the Democratic Party
 In Romania (see list of historical political parties in Romania)
 the Free and Independent Fraction (1864-1884)
 the National Liberal Party (1875-1940)
 the Radical Party (1884–19??), splinter of the former;
 In Serbia
 the Serbian Progressive Party (1881-1919)
 the People's Radical Party (1881–1926)
 the Independent Radical Party (1903-1919),  left-wing splinter of the former
 the State Party of Serbian, Croatian and Slovene Democrats (1919-1946) and its splinter, the Republican and Democratic Party (1924-1946)
 the Serbian Radical Party (1991–present)
 In Turkey, the Republican People's Party (1919-1980)

In Central and Eastern Europe, Radicalism was less potent but nonetheless prominent political force:

 In Czechoslovakia and its predecessor territories:
 the Young Czech Party (1874-1918)
 the Czech National Social Party (1897–present)
In Russia and its historical territories:
Constitutional Democratic Party
Trudovik Party 
In Ukraine and its predecessor territories:
the Ruthenian-Ukrainian Radical Party (1890-1926)
the Radical Socialist Party of Ukraine (1926-1950)
Radical Party (Ukraine) (2010–present)

United Kingdom
Radicals (UK) (17??–1859)

South America

Argentina
Radical Civic Union (1891–present)
People's Radical Civic Union (1957–1972), led by Ricardo Balbín
Intransigent Radical Civic Union (1957–1972)

Bolivia
Radical Party (Bolivia) (1913–1943)

Chile
Radical Party (Chile) (1863–1994)
Social Democrat Radical Party (1994–present)

Ecuador
Ecuadorian Radical Liberal Party (182?–present)
Alfarista Radical Front (1972–present)

Paraguay
Authentic Radical Liberal Party (1978–present)

Asia

India
Radical Democratic Party (India) (1940–1948)

Israel
Meri-Israeli Radical Camp (1960s-1970s)

Oceania

New Zealand
Radical Party (New Zealand) (1896–19??)

See also
Radicalism (historical)
Political radicalism
National Radical Party (disambiguation)
Italian Radicals (disambiguation)
Free-minded Party